Denis Mijatović (born 1 June 1983), is a Croatian futsal player who plays for MNK Vrgorac GTP and the Croatia national futsal team.

References

External links
UEFA profile

1983 births
Living people
Croatian men's futsal players